Eddra Gale (July 16, 1921 – May 13, 2001) was an American actress and singer of Czech descent.

Early years
Born in Chicago, Illinois, Gale was the daughter of an executive with a men's clothing company. Both of her parents were musically oriented. Gale began performing when she was three years old. She spoke French, German, Italian, and Spanish.

Career
Originally an opera singer, Gale later performed as a concert singer in Rome. Film director Federico Fellini spotted her in Milan, and cast her for the role of Saraghina, the "devil woman", in Fellini's 8½ (1963), who is used in a flashback representing the male lead's first erotic experience as a young boy. She appeared around the same time in Tutto e Musica and Gidget Goes to Rome (also 1963).

Following her role in 8½,, she appeared in the role of Peter Sellers' wife, Anna Fassbender, in What's New Pussycat? (1965), as a guest in Hotel Paradiso (1966), and in small roles in films such as Three Bites of the Apple (1967), The Graduate (1967), A Man Called Gannon (1968), I Love You, Alice B. Toklas (1968), The Maltese Bippy (1969), Desperate Mission (1969), and Alex & the Gypsy (1976). Her last film appearance was as "Genevieve" in Somewhere in Time (1980).

Death
Gale died aged 79 in Deming, New Mexico, from complications following a stroke.

Filmography

References

External links

1921 births
2001 deaths
Actresses from Chicago
Singers from Chicago
American film actresses
20th-century American women  opera singers
20th-century American actresses
Classical musicians from Illinois